The Mutiny Act 1703 (2 & 3 Anne c. 20) was one of the Mutiny Acts passed by the Parliament of England. Although its main purpose was to provide for the punishment of mutiny in the English Army and Royal Navy and other provisions for regulating the armed forces, it differed from other Mutiny Acts by providing (in section 34) for a new species of treason, which was committed by any officer or soldier who corresponded with any rebel or enemy without a licence to do so from the queen or from a general, lieutenant-general or "chief commander." Section 43 expressly provided that a defendant charged with that offence was to have the benefit of the safeguards in the Treason Act 1695.

References

Statutes at Large, vol. XI, Danby Pickering, Cambridge University Press, 1765.

See also
Correspondence with Enemies Act 1691
High treason in the United Kingdom
Treason Act

Acts of the Parliament of England
Treason in England
1703 in law
1703 in England